Helictotrichon, or alpine oatgrass, is a genus of perennial flowering plants in the grass family. The genus name comes from the Greek heliktos meaning twisted, and trichos meaning hair, referring to the shape of the awn.

Most of the species are native to Africa and Eurasia with a few species in North America. Helictotrichon sempervirens is widely cultivated as an ornamental.

 Species
 Helictotrichon altius (Hitchc.) Ohwi - China
 Helictotrichon angustum C.E.Hubb. - Kenya, Yemen
 Helictotrichon arctum Cope - Yemen
 Helictotrichon barbatum (Nees) Schweick. - South Africa
 Helictotrichon burmanicum Bor - Myanmar
 Helictotrichon cantabricum (Lag.) Gervais - Pyrenees in France + Spain
 Helictotrichon capense Schweick. - South Africa
 Helictotrichon convolutum (C.Presl) Henrard - Italy, Greece, Balkans, Turkey, Syria, Lebanon
 Helictotrichon cycladum (Rech.f. & T.C.Scheff.) Rech.f. - Greece incl Crete
 Helictotrichon decorum (Janka) Henrard - Romania
 Helictotrichon delavayi (Hack.) Henrard - China
 Helictotrichon desertorum (Less.) Nevski - Austria, Czech Rep, Ukraine, Russia, Kazakhstan, Kyrgyzstan, Mongolia
 Helictotrichon devesae Romero Zarco - Spain
 Helictotrichon dodii (Stapf) Schweick. - South Africa
 Helictotrichon elongatum (Hochst. ex A.Rich.) C.E.Hubb. - Madagascar; Africa from Chad to Eritrea to Zimbabwe
 Helictotrichon fedtschenkoi (Hack.) Henrard - Kyrgyzstan, Tajikistan
 Helictotrichon filifolium (Lag.) Henrard - Spain, Morocco, Algeria
 Helictotrichon galpinii Schweick. - South Africa, Lesotho
 Helictotrichon hideoi (Honda) Ohwi - Japan, Taiwan
 Helictotrichon hirtulum (Steud.) Schweick. - South Africa, Lesotho
 Helictotrichon hissaricum (Roshev.) Henrard - Tajikistan
 Helictotrichon imberbe (Nees) Veldkamp - South Africa, Lesotho, Eswatini
 Helictotrichon junghuhnii (Buse) Henrard - China, Indian Subcontinent, Myanmar, Sumatra, Java, New Guinea
 Helictotrichon × krischae H.Melzer - Austria
 Helictotrichon krylovii (Pavlov) Henrard - Yakutia, Magadan
 Helictotrichon lachnanthum (Hochst. ex A.Rich.) C.E.Hubb. - Bioko, Ethiopia, Tanzania, Kenya, Uganda
 Helictotrichon leianthum (Keng) Ohwi - China
 Helictotrichon leoninum (Steud.) Schweick. - South Africa
 Helictotrichon longifolium (Nees) Schweick. - South Africa, Lesotho
 Helictotrichon longum (Stapf) Schweick. - South Africa
 Helictotrichon macrostachyum (Balansa & Durieu) Henrard - Algeria
 Helictotrichon mannii (Pilg.) C.E.Hubb. - Bioko, Cameroon
 Helictotrichon milanjianum (Rendle) C.E.Hubb. - Madagascar, East Africa
 Helictotrichon mongolicum (Roshev.) Henrard - Siberia, Mongolia, Xinjiang, Kazakhstan
 Helictotrichon mortonianum (Scribn.) Henrard - USA (Colorado, Wyoming, Utah, New Mexico)
 Helictotrichon murcicum Holub - Spain
 Helictotrichon namaquense Schweick. - South Africa
 Helictotrichon natalense (Stapf) Schweick. - South Africa
 Helictotrichon newtonii (Stapf) C.E.Hubb. - Angola
 Helictotrichon parlatorei  (J.Woods) Pilg. - Alps of France, Italy, Switzerland, Austria, Slovenia
 Helictotrichon petzense H.Melzer - Alps of Austria, Slovenia
 Helictotrichon planifolium (Willk.) Holub - Pyrenees in France + Spain
 Helictotrichon polyneurum (Hook.f.) Henrard - Tamil Nadu
 Helictotrichon potaninii Tzvelev - Sichuan
 Helictotrichon quinquesetum (Steud.) Schweick. - South Africa
 Helictotrichon requienii (Mutel) Henrard - France + Spain
 Helictotrichon rogerellisii Mashau, Fish & A.E.van Wyk - South Africa
 Helictotrichon roggeveldense Mashau, Fish & A.E.van Wyk - South Africa
 Helictotrichon sangilense Krasnob. - Tuva in Siberia
 Helictotrichon sarracenorum (Gand.) Holub - Spain
 Helictotrichon schmidii (Hook.f.) Henrard - India, China
 Helictotrichon sedenense (Clarion ex DC.) Holub - France, Spain, Italy, Morocco
 Helictotrichon sempervirens (Vill.) Pilg. - Blue oat grass - France, Italy
 Helictotrichon setaceum (Vill.) Henrard - France, Italy
 Helictotrichon sumatrense Ohwi - Sumatra
 Helictotrichon tianschanicum (Roshev.) Henrard - Kyrgyzstan, Tajikistan, Kazakhstan, Xinjiang
 Helictotrichon tibeticum (Roshev.) Holub - China incl Tibet + Xinjiang
 Helictotrichon turcomanicum Czopanov - Turkmenistan
 Helictotrichon umbrosum (Hochst. ex Steud.) C.E.Hubb. - Ethiopia, Sudan, South Sudan, Kenya, Uganda, Tanzania
 Helictotrichon uniyalii Kandwal & B.K.Gupta - Uttarakhand
 Helictotrichon yunnanense S.Wang & B.S.Sun - Yunnan

 formerly included
Many species once considered part of Helictotrichon are now regarded as better suited to other genera. A large number are now in Helictochloa with smaller numbers of species in Amphibromus Arrhenatherum Avenula Danthoniastrum Duthiea Tricholemma and Trisetum.

References 

 
Bunchgrasses of Africa
Bunchgrasses of Asia
Bunchgrasses of Europe
Poaceae genera
Taxonomy articles created by Polbot